Chetriș is a commune in Făleşti District, Moldova. It is composed of two villages, Chetriș and Chetrișul Nou (depopulated as of 2014).

References

Communes of Fălești District